Giuliano Battocletti (born 1 August 1975) is an Italian former long-distance runner.

He is in the top ten Italian all-time lists in three speciality (5000 metres, 10,000 metres and half marathon).

Biography
Giuliano Battocletti has won two medals at the International athletics competitions (one at junior level and one with the team). He has 17 caps in national team from 1993 to 2005.

Doping
Battocletti tested positive for Nandrolon at Campionato Italiano Maratone 12 June 1999 and received a 16 doping month ban.

Achievements

National titles
Giuliano Battocletti has won 6 times the individual national championship.
1 win in 10,000 metres (2005)
2 wins in Half marathon (2002, 2007)
3 wins in Cross country running (2003, 2004, 2007)

See also
 Italian all-time lists - 5000 metres
 Italian all-time lists - 10000 metres
 Italian all-time lists - Half marathon

References

External links
 

1975 births
Doping cases in athletics
Italian sportspeople in doping cases
Living people
Italian male long-distance runners
Italian male marathon runners
Italian male cross country runners